Arijit Basu (born 16 June 1976) is an Indian former cricketer. He played three first-class matches for Bengal in 2000/01.

See also
 List of Bengal cricketers

References

External links
 

1976 births
Living people
Indian cricketers
Bengal cricketers
Cricketers from Kolkata